"Body Body" is Lebanese Canadian R&B/[pop singer Massari's second single from his second studio album Forever Massari. The song samples the Salt-n-Pepa hit "Push It".

Music video
A music video directed by Marc André Debruyne was released on iTunes on 10 November 2009, featuring Massari and a group of girls in a Luxy night club in Woodbridge, Ontario. Some scenes also show suggestive dancing by the girls in a disco atmosphere.

Charts

References

2009 singles
2009 songs
Massari songs
Universal Music Group singles
Songs written by Rupert Gayle
Songs written by Massari